Roseville station may refer to:

Roseville station (California), an Amtrak station in Roseville, California, USA
Roseville railway station, Sydney, a railway station in Roseville, New South Wales, Australia
Roseville Avenue station, a former NJ Transit station in Roseville, New Jersey, USA

See also
Roseville (disambiguation)